Below is a list of current railway stations in Bologna, Italy.

Active stations

Planned stations (as of 2018) 
 Bologna Borgo Panigale Scala railway station
 Bologna Prati di Caprara railway station
 Bologna Zanardi railway station

See also 
 Bologna metropolitan railway service
 List of railway stations in Emilia-Romagna

References 

 
Bologna
Railway stations